Islam is the largest and majority religion in Sierra Leone. Based on the 2015 Pew Research Center research, 78% of Sierra Leone's population is Muslim.

The vast majority of Sierra Leonean Muslims are adherent to the Sunni Islam.

Composition and practice 
There are 16 ethnic groups in Sierra Leone, the two largest being the Temne and Mende are both Muslim majority. Ten of Sierra Leone's sixteen ethnic groups are Muslim majority.

The vast majority of Sierra Leonean Muslims are Sunni of the Maliki school of Jurisprudence.

History 
In the early 18th century Fulani and Mande-speaking tribesmen from the Fouta Djallon region of present-day Guinea converted many Temne of northern Sierra Leone to Islam. During the period of British rule, attempts to spread Christianity were mostly ineffective.

Islam continued to spread after independence in 1961; in 1960 the Muslim population was 35 percent and grew to 60 percent by 2000, and then to 71% in 2008. It is difficult for people from Sierra Leone to travel to Mecca for the Hajj, the fifth pillar of Islam, due to the distance between the two places and the cost of travel being beyond the means of most Sierra Leoneans. The 2014-2016 Ebola crisis worsened the situation by making it impossible for Sierra Leoneans to obtain Visas to Saudi Arabia.

The recent Sierra Leone Civil War was secular in nature featuring members of Christian, Muslim, and Tribal faiths fighting on both sides of the conflict.

See also 
Ahmadiyya in Sierra Leone
Christianity in Sierra Leone
Hinduism in Sierra Leone

 
Sierra Leone